Jennifer Carlson is an American sociologist. In 2022, she won a MacArthur Fellowship.

Life 
She graduated from Dartmouth College, and University of California at Berkeley. From 2013 to 2016, she taught at the University of Toronto.  She teaches at the University of Arizona.

Works 

 Citizen-Protectors: The Everyday Politics of Guns in an Age of Decline (Oxford University Press 2015) 
 Policing the Second Amendment: Guns, Public Law Enforcement and the Politics of Race (Princeton University Press, 2020)
 Merchants of the Right: Gun Sellers and the Crisis of Democracy (Princeton University Press, Forthcoming 2023)

References

External links 

 https://jdawncarlson.com/

American sociologists
Living people
American women sociologists
Dartmouth College alumni
University of California, Berkeley alumni
Academic staff of the University of Toronto
University of Arizona faculty
MacArthur Fellows
Year of birth missing (living people)